The World Bank Building of Asmara, Eritrea is a large Italian villa built in 1938 which was bought by the World Bank to house its headquarters in that country. The architecture of the building is a mixture of futurist and art deco architectural styles.

Sources
Asmara: The Frozen City, Jochen Visscher and Stefan Boness (Jovis, 2007)

Houses in Eritrea
World Bank
Houses completed in 1938
Buildings and structures in Asmara
Art Deco architecture
Futurist architecture
Modernist architecture in Eritrea
1938 establishments in Africa